Alonso e Cora (Alonso and Cora) is an opera seria in three acts by Francesco Bianchi. The libretto was by Giuseppe Foppa, after Ferdinando Moretti's Idalide, o sia La vergine del sole, as used by Giuseppe Sarti in Milan in 1783. The original source of this text was in turn Jean François Marmontel's Les Incas, ou La destruction de l'empire du Pérou (1777). 

The opera was notable for its spectacular effects which included sea scenes and a volcanic eruption, and its opulent music which involved concertato choruses, ensembles (including one quintet), and a ballet contributing to the grand conclusion in the last act.  

Simon Mayr also set a version of the story, under the same title, for Milan in 1803.

Performance history
The opera was first performed at the Teatro San Benedetto in Venice on 7 February 1786.

Roles

Synopsis
A love story set in the new world. Alonso, the Spanish conquistador, rescues Cora, an Inca maiden, when the Temple of the Sun is destroyed by a volcanic eruption, but thereby unwittingly breaks the law that forbids her to leave the temple, on pain of being sacrificed to the gods. Alonso is willing to die with her, but the people take mercy and abolish the ancient law.

References

McClymonds, Marita P (1992), 'Alonso e Cora' in The New Grove Dictionary of Opera, ed. Stanley Sadie (London) 
McClymonds, Marita P (1992), 'Vergine del sole, La' in The New Grove Dictionary of Opera, ed. Stanley Sadie (London) 

Opera seria
Operas by Francesco Bianchi
1786 operas
Italian-language operas
Operas